22 Corps, 22nd Corps, Twenty Second Corps, or XXII Corps may refer to:

XXII Reserve Corps, a unit of the Imperial German Army during World War I
XXII Corps (Ottoman Empire), a unit in World War I
XXII Corps (Union Army), a unit in the American Civil War
XXII Corps (United States)
XXII Corps (United Kingdom)
XXII Mountain Corps (Wehrmacht)
XXII Army Corps (Wehrmacht)
22nd Army Corps (Russian Empire), a unit of the Imperial Russian Army between 1905 and 1918
22nd Army Corps (Russian Federation), a unit of the Russian Army since 2017

See also
List of military corps by number